Michèle Lamy (1944) is a French culture and fashion figure. She has been a clothing designer, performer, film producer, and restaurateur, and is the life partner of Rick Owens. She is the co founding partner of Owenscorp and functions as the Executive Manager Art/Furniture.

Early life and education 
Michèle Lamy was born in 1944 in Jura, France. Her grandfather made accessories for one of France's most famous couturiers, Paul Poiret.

She studied law, and during the 60s and 70s, worked as a defense lawyer, while studying with the postmodern philosopher Gilles Deleuze. She was involved in the May 1968 protests in Paris. She then worked as a cabaret dancer and toured France before moving to the United States in 1979.

Career 
In 1979, Lamy moved to New York and then settled in Los Angeles, where she set up a fashion line and ran two cult restaurants/nightclubs – Café des Artistes and Les Deux Cafés in 1996 with her first husband, experimental filmmaker Richard Newton. With her tattooed fingers and gold-plated teeth, she was an emblematic figure of nightlife in Los Angeles in the middle of 90s. Her tattoos were inspired by the Berbers, during her first trip to North Africa when she was around 17 or 18 years old.

In 1990, Lamy created a clothing line called Lamy. She hired Rick Owens, who later became her business partner and, then, her companion and husband. In 2003, Lamy and Owens left Los Angeles to settle in Paris and got married in 2006. In 2004, the couple established their own fashion company Owenscorp, describing their business partnership as "asking a gypsy to organise a war with a fascist." 

Lamy produces the furniture that bears the Owens brand. She also designs jewelry with Loree Rodkin and has appeared in FKA twigs and Black Asteroid music videos. She formed the band LAVASCAR with the artist Nico Vascellari and her daughter Scarlett Rouge.

In November 2010, Lamy posed for a shoot for Vogue Paris with the photographer Steven Klein. In 2013, Lamy was featured in Forbes with her daughter from her first marriage, artist Scarlett Rouge. In 2015, she was featured in one of the videos for the EP M3LL155X by FKA Twigs. Lamy appeared in the first clip; Figure 8, wearing a headpiece with a luminous bulb imitating an anglerfish.

At the 2016 Venice Biennale, Lamy transformed an old container ship into a floating saloon. The same year, she recorded songs with her good friend, rapper A$AP Rocky. Rocky said about Lamy, "Hardly anyone knows how important you have been behind the scenes for my career. You did not just design my album covers, you took me to art fairs and showed me the art world."

In 2017, Lamy and Rick Owens were featured in Lou Stoppard's book about fashion's most important and iconic duos, titled Fashion Together: Fashion's Most Extraordinary Duos on the Art of Collaboration. In the book, Owens said that Lamy was more his "mate" than "muse." And, "I don't think anyone would ever think of Michèle as a passive muse. I think that's why she sparks people's interest—because she doesn't fit the typical role of a muse."

Lamy has practiced boxing for 35 years. In 2018, she set up her own boxing gym "Lamyland" in Selfridges, London. The space previously was home to A$AP Rocky's AWGE Bodega. It is now reinvented every few months. In October 2018, Lamy curated a performance series featuring a tour of "Outsider Art Fair Paris" by  British performance artist David Hoyle.

In January 2019, Lamy held an installation art "Genius You" in collaboration with Dutch photographer Paul Kooiker, taking place all around Selfridges, London. From May to November 2019, her boxing installation: "What Are We Fighting For?", had been shown in Venice Biennale.

Lamy said about her approach to fashion and design, "I like to really be with a lot of people and exchange ideas and the best way to be is to do something together, so I'm easily seduced… And when it's the idea or I want to lead a bunch of people somewhere and do something together, I think that's generous."

In 2020, Lamy will collaborate with director Katya Bankowsky for Battle Royale, a series of short films that feature Bankowsky and Lamy preparing for a fight.

Personal life 
Michèle Lamy has one daughter, artist Scarlett Rouge.

References 

1944 births
Living people